Heavy Medal is the second studio album of Hungarian rock band P. Mobil, recorded in 1983.

The record was released in east Europe and USSR.

Track listing
 Nem érhet baj/I'm safe
 Lámpagyár/Lamp factory
 Szép volt/It was beautiful
 Metalmánia/Metal Mania
 Az óra körbejárt/We rock around the clock
 Heavy Medal
 Aranyásó szakkör/Gold Diggers'
 Hányas a kabát/What size is your coat
 Pléhkrisztus/Tin Christ

Bonus tracks on CD-edition (2003) 

 Forma I/Formula I (1978, single)
 Utolsó cigaretta/One More Drag (1978, single)
 Bíborlepke/Purple Butterfly (1976, demo)
 Asszonyt akarok/I want a Woman (1976, demo)
 Örökmozgó/Perpetum Mobile (1976, demo)
 Lőj rám!/Shoot Me! (1977/78, demo)
 A király/The King (1977/78, demo)
 Go On (1978/79, English demo)
 Tuppence Song (1978/79, English demo)
 Night of Phoenix (1978/79, English demo)

Line-up 
László Kékesi – bass, backing vocals
István Mareczky – drums, percussion
Vilmos Sárvári – guitars, backing vocals
Lóránt Schuster - band-leader, lyrics, backing vocals
Péter Tunyogi - lead vocals
András Zeffer – keyboards, backing vocals

On bonus tracks 
Sándor Bencsik – guitars, backing vocals
István Cserháti – keyboards, backing vocals
Zoltán Pálmai – drums, percussion (1976–1977)
Gyula Vikidál – lead vocals

1983 albums
P. Mobil albums